Defector is the fourth studio album by English guitarist and songwriter Steve Hackett, released in June 1980 on Charisma Records. After touring in support of his previous album, Spectral Mornings (1979), Hackett took his band into Wessex Sound Studios to record a follow-up.

The album remains Hackett's highest charting album on the UK Albums Chart, reaching No. 9. "The Show" was released as a single. In 2005, Defector was remastered and re-released on Virgin Records. The new edition features updated liner notes and five bonus tracks. A surround mix was included in the Premonitions: The Charisma Recordings 1975–1983 box set.

Background
By early 1980, Hackett had finished touring his previous album, Spectral Mornings (1979) which at the time of release, became his strongest selling album. Hackett wanted to capitalise on the commercial momentum he had achieved by rehearsing new material for a follow-up with his touring band prior to recording it in a studio. This way, he could finish it quickly and resume touring. Hackett found new sources of inspiration in his writing, specifically the 1970 political drama film The Conformist as a model for the imagery that he conjured in his mind and uses to write songs. He had spent Christmas of 1979 in Washington, D.C. which resulted in "more and more thoughts about less romantic things". "Slogans" reminded him of an out of control vehicle, and thought of "a mob feel; something run riot", futuristic, and propaganda themes. Though the album is a collection of songs, Hackett described its underlying theme: "There's a lot of heavy kind of claustrophobic kind of feelings from the idea of someone being trapped in a situation (in the broadest sense of the word) and having to move away to something else, somewhere else, somebody else... I see it more in terms of 'Defector' as a metaphor really and music as the supreme language of metaphor".

Recording

Defector was recorded in the spring of 1980 at Wessex Sound Studios in Highbury, north London. As the material was already rehearsed, Hackett noted that recording was quickly done, yet without cutting corners on the production as he had typically spent more time "getting things right" in the past. Following its release, Hackett had become increasingly aware of the musical direction of his past albums, and aimed for his next one to sound "less monumental".

Release

Defector reached No. 9 on the UK Albums Chart, and remains Hackett's highest charting album in the UK. "The Show" was released as a single. Hackett supported the album with a sell-out UK tour In additional, he performed for the first time as a solo artist in North America.

Track listing
All songs written by Steve Hackett, except where indicated.

Side 1
 "The Steppes" – 6:05
 "Time to Get Out" – 4:11
 "Slogans" – 3:46
 "Leaving" – 3:16
 "Two Vamps as Guests" – 1:58
Side 2
 "Jacuzzi" – 4:36
 "Hammer in the Sand" – 3:11
 "The Toast" – 3:42
 "The Show" – 3:40
 "Sentimental Institution" (Steve Hackett, Peter Hicks) – 2:44

2005 Remaster Bonus Tracks
"Hercules Unchained" (B-side of "The Show") (Steve Hackett, Peter Hicks) – 2:44
"Sentimental Institution" (Live at the Theatre Royal, Drury Lane) (Steve Hackett, Peter Hicks) – 3:02
"The Steppes" (Live at the Reading Festival) – 6:33
"Slogans" (Live at the Reading Festival) – 4:19
"Clocks – The Angel of Mons" (Live at the Reading Festival) – 5:54

2016 Remaster Bonus Tracks and DVD - New Pseudo 5.1 Surround Sound Up-mix From The Original Stereo Master Tapes
"The Air Conditioned Nightmare" (Live at the Reading Festival) – 4:42	
"Every Day" (Live at the Reading Festival) – 6:48	
"Ace Of Wands" (Live at the Reading Festival) – 6:45	
"Funny Feeling" (Live at the Reading Festival) – 4:17	
"The Steppes" (Live at the Reading Festival) – 6:12	
"Overnight Sleeper" (Live at the Reading Festival) – 4:52	
"Slogans" (Live at the Reading Festival) – 4:42	
"The Tower Struck Down" (Live at the Reading Festival) – 3:13	
"Spectral Mornings" (Live at the Reading Festival) – 6:10	
"The Show" (Live at the Reading Festival) – 4:32	
"Clocks - The Angel Of Mons" (Live at the Reading Festival) – 6:05

Personnel
Credits taken from the album's 1980 liner notes.

Steve Hackett – electric and acoustic guitars, harmony vocals on "Time to Get Out, The Toast", backing vocals on "Leaving, The Show", Optigan on "Sentimental Institution", Roland GR-500 guitar synthesizer
Pete Hicks – lead vocals on "Time To Get Out, Leaving, The Toast, The Show", vocals on "Sentimental Institution"
Dik Cadbury – bass guitar, Moog Taurus bass pedals, harmony/backing vocals on "Time To Get Out, Leaving, The Toast, The Show"
Nick Magnus – keyboards, Prophet 5, Clavinet, Fender Rhodes & RMI electric pianos, Novatron, Vox String Thing, Minimoog, Roland SH-2000, Roland Vp-330 Vocoder on "Slogans", piano on "Hammer In The Sand"
John Hackett – concert and alto flute
John Shearer – drums, percussion

Production
Steve Hackett – production
John Acock – production
Jed and Vince – gear
Kim Poor – insight and cover paintings, enamels, cover design
Kim and Kobz – cover design
Danny Padua – inner sleeve
Armando Gallo – collage photos
Gered Mankowitz – collage photos

References

1980 albums
Steve Hackett albums
Charisma Records albums